AVRT may refer to:

 Addictive Voice Recognition Technique, a technique used in Rational Recovery
 Atrioventricular reentrant tachycardia